The following is a list of heads of the Chicago Fire Department in Chicago, Illinois United States.  This includes heads of the original iteration of Chicago's fire department, a volunteer force which preceded the establishment of the current, professional, fire department in 1858.

Currently the executive of the Chicago Fire Department is referred to as the "fire commissioner". Before this, the head of the department was known as the "chief engineer".

The current head, holding the position of "fire commissioner", is Annette Nance Holt, appointed by mayor Lori Lightfoot in 2021.

History
Currently, the head of the Chicago Fire Department is appointed by the mayor of Chicago, and confirmed by the Chicago City Council.

Originally, the leader of the Chicago Fire Department was known as chief engineer. This position was created by an ordinance passed by the then-village of Chicago's board of trustees in November 1835. In December 1835, Chicago's board of trustees appointed its president Hirman Hugunin to be the inaugural occupant of this position. In 1837, when Chicago was incorporated as a city, its charter had the position be one which was elected annually by the city's voters. If an election saw no candidates, thus failing to produce an occupant of the office, the Chicago Common Council (as the Chicago City Council was known as the time) would appoint one. This position originally oversaw a volunteer fire department, until the modern iteration of the Chicago Fire Department was established by city ordinance on August 2, 1858.

In 1927, the title of chief engineer was replaced with the new title of fire commissioner.

List of heads of the Chicago Fire Department

Chief Engineers (1835–1927)

Fire Commissioners (1927–present)

Notes
 Hirman Hugunin and George E Snow's tenures predate the incorporation of Chicago as a city. While no mayor was serving at the time they were High Constable, John H. Kinzie was Town President

See also
List of heads of the Chicago Police Department
Fire chief

References

Chicago Fire Department
Heads of the Chicago Fire Department